Cameron David McTaggart (born 30 September 1997) is a New Zealand weightlifter. He won the gold medal in the men's 81 kg event at the 2019 Pacific Games held in Apia, Samoa.

In 2018, he represented New Zealand at the Commonwealth Games held in Gold Coast, Australia. He finished in 7th place in the men's 77 kg event.

He represented New Zealand at the 2020 Summer Olympics in Tokyo, Japan. He competed in the men's 81 kg event.

He competed in the men's 81 kg event at the 2022 Commonwealth Games held in Birmingham, England.

References

External links 
 

Living people
1997 births
Place of birth missing (living people)
New Zealand male weightlifters
Weightlifters at the 2014 Summer Youth Olympics
Weightlifters at the 2018 Commonwealth Games
Weightlifters at the 2022 Commonwealth Games
Commonwealth Games competitors for New Zealand
Weightlifters at the 2020 Summer Olympics
Olympic weightlifters of New Zealand
20th-century New Zealand people
21st-century New Zealand people